Anti-Electric Vehicle Tactics in the US and Canada  are the methods used by automobile companies in the United States during the 20th century to encourage the decline of electric-power mass transportation.

The General Motors streetcar conspiracy is the biggest and best-known effort to attain a freeway, parking lot, and internal-combustion transportation monopoly in US and Canadian cities. However, General Motors and many other companies and individuals used a wide range of methods to achieve this. These less well-known strategies were extensive and lasted for decades. Schemes were used against not just streetcars, but interurban and electric intercity railroads, subways and electric trolleybuses as well. The number of electric railway lines was dramatically reduced, and commuter rail lines and subways deteriorated to sometimes-deplorable states. General Motors was also engaged in long litigation with the antitrust division of the US Department of Justice for its near-monopoly of bus manufacturing.

History

Background

General Motors' bus manufacturing division, Yellow Truck and Coach, was chronically unprofitable over the decade 1925-1935. In 1935, its assets were $44,000,000, but the subsidiary had lost money for seven of the ten previous years. In 1927, Yellow lost $6,850,000. However, with the sales of nearly 800 buses on Manhattan, big sales to New Jersey,  and many more to National City Lines-owned companies, Yellow became very lucrative.

In 1935, GM created a front company, Portland Motor Coach, to perform a bus conversion in Portland OR. However, its reluctance to admit GM backing antagonized the local newspapers, city council and mayor Joseph Carson. An editorial in the Oregonian newspaper read in part: "It must be said that the Portland Motor Coach Company, through its local representatives, has developed a signally marked tendency to antagonize where it would be better to cultivate ... the company representatives have gone about, chip on shoulder, looking for opposition, unfairness and trouble, and finding them whether they exist or not"

Portland Motor Coach greatly irritated its potential civic partners by insisting they would not pay for rail removal. The company said it could “...see no reason why United Cities [PMC’s owner] should pay for someone else’s mistakes.” This angered Mayor Carson, who didn’t want to “...unload this $1,000,000 or $2,000,000 burden on the backs of Portland taxpayers.” In the end, the bus firm was unable to come up with enough petition signatures to put the bus versus streetcar question to referendum, so its bus conversion offer collapsed.

By the following year, when GM-controlled National City Lines moved to replace trams in Bloomington-Normal IL with buses, it continued to avoid disclosing where the corporate backing was. GM "...has no part in the company's ownership", it reported to the local newspaper.

City councilors in the Illinois city were suspicious of holding companies performing bus conversions. In Bloomington-Normal IL, councilor Alonzo Sargent said, "It looks screwy to me. I've heard all about holding companies before."

Ford Motor Co. in Victoria BC

GM wasn't the only bus manufacturer to denigrate rail transportation, although other bus manufacturers were less aggressive and secretive than GM. Ford once made transit buses, and in 1946, did a study for the city of Victoria BC. It says "The abandonment of street car service in your city and its replacement with rubber tired vehicles can be adequately justified by engineering, economics, and by the benefits that would accrue to the communities served by the transportation system." Victoria's tram system was replaced with buses in 1948.

GM in New Jersey

GM enjoyed an exceptionally warm relationship with the big Public Service Coordinated Transport (PSCT) firm, which provided most transit in New Jersey. In 1955, the antitrust division of the US Justice Dept. lumped PSCT together with Greyhound and Omnibus as receiving preferential prices from the bus manufacturer.  In December 1947, PSCT abandoned electric tram service in the one-mile long Newark Tunnel, saying that diesel buses could do the job. A citizens group, the Modern Transit Committee, fought this. Over the years 1933-1971, PSCT bought 6,437 new buses from General Motors, 526 from Ford, 41 Macks and 18 Brills.

GM in Jamestown & Buffalo NY

John G (Jerry) Campbell made his career with General Motors and associated companies. An early job was as a mechanic with the Chevrolet brothers, Arthur, Gaston and Louis, Swiss-French immigrants who drove and developed race cars. The three brothers also started what became GM's most famous division.

In 1938, Campbell, oversaw the bus conversion in Jamestown NY. In 1943, he acquired Buffalo Transit, where the last tram ran in 1950. At its peak, the city had a 350 kilometer electric railway network.

The transit business seems to have been fairly remunerative for Campbell. In 1949, he was able to entertain General Motors president Charles E. Wilson (Engine Charlie) and others on board Campbell's yacht in Florida. The yacht, "Pastime" sailed to Biscayne Bay for parties and chicken fries.

GM in Kentucky

in March 1938, National City Lines president E. Roy Fitzgerald and four NCL employees met with Lexington,  KY entrepreneur Norman Smith at Smith's cottage on Herrington Lake, southwest of Lexington. Smith and his brother Leroy operated various transportation businesses around Lexington, and bought control of that city's transit system. Likely not coincidentally, the bus conversion in Lexington was performed later that year.

The meeting came to light because of a serious fire in which five of the six people sleeping in Smith's cottage suffered injuries, which were treated at Good Samaritan Hospital in Lexington.

Norman Smith subsequently made an offer to replace streetcars with buses in Louisville, KY.

GM in Savannah, GA

In 1945, GM Truck and Coach Sales manager Eddie Crenshaw and two salesmen bought control of the transit system in the Georgia coastal city. The story about the sale in the Savannah paper made no mention of any connection to General Motors or National City Lines, consistent with GM's secretive approach. Georgia Power had already converted most of Savannah's tram lines to buses.

Saving Seattle's Trolleybus System

In 1964, the Washington Society of Professional Engineers (WSPE) campaigned to stop the conversion of Seattle's electric trolleybus system to diesel. They had more success than Joseph P. Ruth, an inventor and businessman who had tried to stop the dieselisation of the trolleybus network in Denver in 1955. The basic advantage of electric motors, The WSPE pointed out, was that "The efficiency of the Diesel for power delivery to the rear wheels is around 25%, with the balance of the energy being thrown out unused, as contaminants and heavy air pollution from the muffler. In contrast, the trolley motor at rest is completely so, and in operation has an efficiency at the rear wheels of around 85%"

References 

Electric vehicle industry
Automotive industry